An artist cooperative (also co-operative or co-op) is an autonomous visual arts organization, enterprise, or association jointly owned and democratically controlled by its members. Artist cooperatives are legal entities organized as non-capital stock corporations, non-profit organizations, or unincorporated associations. Such cooperatives typically provide professional facilities and services for its artist-members, including studios, workshops, equipment, exhibition galleries, and educational resources. By design, all economic and non-economic benefits and liabilities of the cooperative are shared equally among its members. Cooperative members elect their board of directors from within the membership.

See also

ABC Artists' Books Cooperative
Artist-run initiative
Artist-run space
National Cooperative Business Association

References

Further reading
"International Artists Cooperative Forms and Launches Web Site." Art Business News November 2001.

External links
ABC Artists’ Books Cooperative
International Co-operative Alliance, Geneva, Switzerland website
The Cooperative Foundation, St. Paul, Minnesota website
University of Wisconsin, Madison, Center for Cooperatives website
University College Cork, Ireland, Centre for Co-operative Studies website
Small Farm Center, University of California website
Mutant space arts resource, Cork, Ireland website 

cooperative